

Tour matches

List A: Sri Lanka Board XI vs Australia XI

First-class: Sri Lankan XI vs Australia

ODI series

1st ODI

2nd ODI

3rd ODI

4th ODI

5th ODI

Test series

1st Test

2nd Test

3rd Test

External links
Series home at Cricinfo

2004 in Australian cricket
2004 in Sri Lankan cricket
2003-04
International cricket competitions in 2003–04
Sri Lankan cricket seasons from 2000–01